The Munich Virgin Annunciate is an oil on wood painting by the Italian Renaissance artist Antonello da Messina, executed in 1473. Like the more famous Palermo version of the same subject, it shows Mary interrupted at her reading by the Angel of the Annunciation.

References

Paintings depicting the Annunciation
Paintings by Antonello da Messina
Collection of the Alte Pinakothek
1473 paintings
Books in art